Henry Melchior Muhlenberg House, also known as the John J. Schrack House, is a historic home located at Trappe, Montgomery County, Pennsylvania.  The house was built about 1755, and is a -story, five bay, stone dwelling with a gable roof. It measures approximately 39 feet by 31 feet.  Between 1994 and 1998, the house was restored to its 1776-1787 appearance. This was the period of residency by Rev. Henry Melchior Muhlenberg (1711-1787), patriarch of the Lutheran Church in the United States, and father of Peter Muhlenberg (1746-1807) and Frederick Muhlenberg (1750-1801). Also on the property are the remains of a pottery kiln dated to about 1720. It is the oldest intact pottery kiln known in Pennsylvania. The house is owned by the Trappe Historical Society and open as a historic house museum.

A Pennsylvania historical marker was dedicated on April 28, 1960. It was added to the National Register of Historic Places in 2000.

References

External links
The Henry Muhlenberg House, Trappe Historical Society

Historic house museums in Pennsylvania
Houses on the National Register of Historic Places in Pennsylvania
Houses completed in 1755
Houses in Montgomery County, Pennsylvania
National Register of Historic Places in Montgomery County, Pennsylvania
Historic House Museums of the Pennsylvania Germans